A Work in Progress is Neil Peart's 2-DVD box-set, documenting the "work in progress" of recording Rush's Test for Echo album, as well as an extensive discussion of the fundamental reinvention of Peart's percussion technique by the tutelage of the expert Freddie Gruber. Neil's special approach to drums is featured in various individual songs from Test for Echo. Other topics include a discussion of Neil's DW drumset, his approach to odd times, playing with a vocalist, and a "guided tour" of Neil's warmup routine.

References

External links – videos
 From Limbo 
 Fill workout
 Gadd Style fills

Neil Peart albums
Rush (band)
2002 films
Documentary films about rock music and musicians